Dávid Katzirz (born 25 June 1980 in Pécs) is a Hungarian handballer who plays for Csurgói KK and the Hungarian national team.

He represented Hungary on four World Championships (2003, 2007, 2009, 2011) and participated on the European Championship in 2010 as well.

Personal
His father, Béla Katzirz is a former Hungarian international footballer.

Achievements
Nemzeti Bajnokság I:
Silver Medalist: 2009, 2010, 2011
Bronze Medalist: 2003, 2004
Magyar Kupa:
Finalist: 2009, 2010
EHF Cup:
Semifinalist: 2003

References

External links
 Dávid Katzirz career statistics at Worldhandball

1980 births
Living people
Hungarian male handball players
Sportspeople from Pécs
Expatriate handball players
Hungarian expatriate sportspeople in Italy
Hungarian expatriate sportspeople in Germany
Hungarian expatriate sportspeople in Croatia